Flavius Abundantius (floruit 375400) was a politician of the Eastern Roman Empire.

Of Scythian origin, he entered the Roman army under emperor Gratian (367-375) and climbed up its ranks until, around 392 and under emperor Theodosius I (378-395), he became magister utriusque militiae. The next year, in 393, he also held the consulate.

The powerful eunuch and courtier Eutropius, who had been introduced by Abundantius into the court, caused his downfall, because he longed for Abundantius' properties: in 396 Eutropius had the new emperor Arcadius exile Abundantius at Pityus on the Black Sea (current Pitsunda in Abkhazia, Georgia) and give all his properties to Eutropius himself. When Eutropius died (399), Abundantius succeeded in being transferred to the more comfortable Sidon, where he was still alive in 400.

References 
 Otto Seeck, "Abundantius 1", Paulys Realencyclopädie der classischen Altertumswissenschaft

4th-century Romans
4th-century Roman consuls
Imperial Roman consuls
Scythian people